The Siak (Sungai Siak) is a river of Riau province, in the east of Sumatra,  Indonesia, about 1000 km northwest of the capital Jakarta. Approximately 370 kilometres in length, the Siak is a blackwater river which owes its brown color to dissolved organic matter (DOM) leached from surrounding, heavily disturbed peat soils; it is heavily polluted, notably by the petroleum industry. It flows through the town of Pekanbaru before emptying into the Strait of Malacca.

Geography
The river flows in the central area of Sumatra with predominantly tropical rainforest climate (designated as Af in the Köppen-Geiger climate classification). The annual average temperature in the area is 23 °C. The warmest month is October, when the average temperature is around 25 °C, and the coldest is January, at 22 °C. The average annual rainfall is 2673 mm. The wettest month is November, with an average of 418 mm rainfall, and the driest is January, with 106 mm rainfall.

See also
List of rivers of Indonesia
List of rivers of Sumatra

References

Rivers of Riau
Rivers of Indonesia